Shalom College may refer to:

Australia 

 Shalom Catholic College, a Catholic school in Bundaberg, Queensland, Australia 
 Shalom College (University of New South Wales), a residential college located on the Kensington campus of the University of New South Wales, in Sydney, Australia